The women's fighting 57 kg competition in ju-jitsu at the 2022 World Games took place on 15 July 2022 at the Birmingham Southern College in Birmingham, United States.

Results

Elimination round

Group A

Group B

Finals
{{#invoke:RoundN|N4
|widescore=yes|bold_winner=high|team-width=260
|RD1=Semifinals
|3rdplace=yes

||{{flagIOC2athlete|Licai Pourtois|BEL|2022 World Games}}|16||4
|||10||16

|||0||0

||

References

Ju-jitsu at the 2022 World Games